Henley Residents Group (HRG) is a local political party in Oxfordshire, England.

Formation
It was formed in 1989 in response to an unpopular town centre development in Henley, Oxfordshire, England, in which Waitrose planned to increase the size of its store, demolishing the town's Regal Cinema. Local residents campaigned against this and, unhappy at the Conservative Party's support for the scheme, stood for election in Henley in May 1991, winning 8 seats at civic parish level, and three district council seats. The plan was subsequently modified to include a replacement cinema, with a three screen cinema.

Elections
HRG had a majority on Henley Town Council until 2003 and continued to be the ruling party after this date.

After two by-election successes in 2017 HRG has 8 out of 16 town council seats, with the rest being Conservative.  It has one seat on South Oxfordshire District Council and, following Stefan Gawrysiak's election for the Henley-on-Thames Division on 4 May 2017, one on Oxfordshire County Council, which was retained in the county council elections of 6 May 2021.

At the May 2019 local elections, Henley Residents Group won all three Henley seats on the district council and twelve of the sixteen seats on Henley Town Council with every candidate elected. They had campaigned for traffic and car parking improvements, local economy and environmental issues, as well as demanding proper affordable housing.

References

External links

Henley Town Council 

Locally based political parties in England
Henley-on-Thames
Political parties established in 1989